Nour Mhanna (Nur Mahana) is a Syrian singer.

Mhanna started his musical career as a reciter of the Qur'an, before switching to secular music. 

On 1 July 2004, he performed at the Sycuan Resort and Casino in El Cajon, California.

Notes

Living people
Syrian Christians
21st-century Syrian male singers
People from Aleppo
Year of birth missing (living people)